Rockslide (Santo Vaccarro) is a fictional mutant superhero and member of the X-Men in the . He is a student in the Xavier Institute and a member of the former Hellions squad therein. After M-Day, he was one of only 28 students to retain his powers. He is best friends with Julian Keller (Hellion) and is extremely close to and protective of Cessily Kincaid (Mercury). Despite his earlier appearances as a stereotypical bully, he has evolved into a good-natured (though extremely boastful) and fiercely protective friend to most of the school's students.

Publication history
Rockslide first appeared in New Mutants vol. 2 #3 and was created by Nunzio DeFilippis and Christina Weir.

Fictional character biography
An Italian-American mutant from Boston, Santo was sent to the Xavier Institute where he befriended Julian and the would-be Hellions. He was originally advised by Iceman, but was selected by Emma Frost to be part of her prized Hellions squad. Vaccaro and the rest of the Hellions went on to win the field tournament and were declared the best squad at the end of the school year. Santo dreams of being a super-human wrestling star and enjoys murder-mystery television programs (such as Medium starring Patricia Arquette and Murder, She Wrote).  He is also a fan of  Dance Dance Revolution.

During the summer vacation, Julian, from a well-to-do background, invited his friends to his home. The Hellions ran into trouble quickly, as his and Cessily's appearances disturbed people at the airport. After a brief struggle, the group was allowed to board, and made their way to California, where Julian originates. Soon, the team encountered the 'Kingmaker', from whom they each received a trial wish. Santo's wish was to become a World-class Champion in superhuman wrestling. However, when the Hellions eventually refused a permanent deal with the Kingmaker, the Kingmaker shattered Santo with a laser blast. Julian used his telekinesis to piece Rockslide back together, and together the Hellions defeated the Kingmaker.

Decimation

After the effects of M-Day, he was one of the few students who didn't lose their powers. The depowered students and staff were sent to their homes. One bus was bombed by anti-mutant religious zealot Reverend William Stryker, and Santo's former teammate and friend Brian (Tag) was among those killed. The X-Men held a funeral for those students whose parents would not accept them, and Santo reflected upon how he had "failed" by not being able to save those killed.

With the mutant population drastically decreased, the government sent the Sentinel O*N*E* Squad to watch over the school, which began housing as many remaining mutants as would take refuge. All of the remaining students were placed by Emma Frost into an all-out brawl, and the ones deemed to be the best were to be assigned to become a group of in-training X-Men. Santo made the team and began training to become an X-Man.

William Stryker continued his terror attacks against the school. Santo's teammate Josh (Elixir) ended Stryker's plans by killing him. The New X-Men, with the help of David (Prodigy), then made the connection between Stryker and Nimrod. The team leader, Nori (Surge), then decided that the team would find and destroy the robot. When the team confronted Nimrod, Rockslide revealed how much the death of his fellow schoolmates had affected him when he intercepted an attack by Nimrod meant for Hellion crying "Not again!" He was obliterated by the attack, fueling the rest of the team in their eventual defeat of Nimrod. Julian and Mercury tried desperately to awaken and to piece him back together, but Rockslide's remains were initially unresponsive. Thankfully, even in his shattered form, he was able to survive, and was finally put back together, only to become larger and more rugged than his previous form. Rockslide is later seen talking to Match and Anole about their abilities and how useful or useless they would be if they joined the New X-Men team, indicating Match and Anole may be possible candidates for admission onto the team. He was at the memorial service for all the students lost in Stryker's attack on the institute.

Rockslide sees the Young Avengers on television, learning about them for the first time, to his fellow students' surprise. He decides that the New X-Men should beat them up, with himself fighting Hulkling. Fellow students Loa and Anole tell him that Hulkling would win.

Rockslide accompanied the X-Men when they jumped from the Blackbird to save Cessily from the Facility. He helped with great enthusiasm during the fight, and in the aftermath, made fun of Shadowcat and her powers, saying that being an X-Man must be "really hard". Kitty then jokingly threatened to kill him.

Quest for Magik
Santo and the other students were captured by Belasco, and taken to Limbo. While hiding from Belasco, along with Blindfold, Match, Loa, Anole, Wolf Cub, Pixie, and Gentle, Santo was unsure what to do. As demons approached the group, Santo fought them off, but then seemingly exploded when he tried to shoot his fists at them. Santo then seems to reconstitute himself in a magma rock form that is also impervious to magic and beats the badness out of Illyana who then helps them to rescue their fellow students and kill Belasco. Back home, Rockslide threatens to quit if Pixie and Anole aren't made part of the New X-Men.

World War Hulk

Rockslide is one of the students that goes up against the Hulk when he attacks the institute. He knocks over the Hulk so the other students can hold him down, but is knocked away when Hulk regains his strength. When Rockslide attacks him alone, it appears that Hulk knows who he is and what he can do. The Hulk rips off both of Rockslide's arms, steps on him, then tears off his legs. He then rids Rockslide of his limbs by throwing them a great distance, ridding Rockslide of his powers and the ability of ambulatory function. His limbs were eventually located after Hulk leaves.

Santo has stated that as a kid he pretended he was the Hulk.

Children of X-Men
Rockslide is seen playing pool with X-23 and Anole; he and X-23 try to convince Anole to let them cut his other arm off. After Santo calls Anole a sissy, Anole gets offended and pushes him out the window while Rockslide proclaims "I swear I didn't know! Don't be so sensitive!" After Rockslide refuses to blow himself up, Anole calls him a sissy to get him to do it. Anole then offers to try and blow up Santo himself.

Beast and Colossus supervise Santo's brief training on exploding and regenerating.

Santo later agrees to stay up with Indra because he is worried that he is going to die and while having an indoor campfire, Santo points out that it doesn't matter how old they are, they are mutants and someone is going to come gunning for them, and when they do he wants to go down fighting. Later, he outs Anole as gay to some of the other students, though Loa was already aware and says that everyone already knew of his orientation.

Messiah Complex

Some of the New-X-Men decide to launch a pre-emptive strike against the Purifiers. After spying on the Purifiers, they are ambushed by the Reavers; Rockslide and X-23 manage to damage Lady Deathstrike’s armor. Pixie then manages to teleport the team out and are spread between Washington and the institute. He was later seen aboard the X-Jet with Iceman and the New-X-Men during the Sentinel attack on the mansion.

Later, he is seen talking with Dust about honoring the dead.  They are joined by Mercury and as they approach the cemetery they find Predator X feasting on the bodies of dead mutants much to their horror. He holds the creature back so the others can escape, knowing that he can't be killed by it, though it does make short work of him.

Young X-Men

Santo meets up with Blindfold at a coffee shop and she tells him about her premonition of soon-to-be-formed Young X-Men squad, including the death of one of their future teammates, though he appears to take no heed. Just as predicted, Cyclops offers Santo the position, but claims that he was not planning on recruiting Blindfold. Santo demands that she be added to the team, stating that Blindfold's premonition included both him and her, and threatened to reject Cyclops' offer if she was not recruited as well.

It is later revealed that Cyclops is really Donald Pierce in disguise manipulating the Young X-Men to attack the original New Mutants, as Blindfold predicted, Wolf Cub is killed in the final confrontation with Pierce, which impacts Santo greatly.

X-Infernus

Santo and Mercury are watching a training session between Pixie and Nightcrawler when Pixie stabs Kurt with her soul dagger. They run in and move Pixie away from Kurt's unconscious body, Beast enters and Pixie regains her senses. When she removes her dagger, Magik's soulsword emerges from his chest and Magik teleports in ready to reclaim her sword.

Rockslide takes on Illyana, thinking he is still resistant to magic, forgetting that it was only when he was composed of Limbo's terrain. Illyana shocks him by easily defeating him.  After he reforms, the gathered X-Men hold a meeting and he along with Mercury are put on a team of X-Men being sent to Limbo due to their resistance to magic, but only if he reforms from Limbo rock.

In Limbo, Rockslide reforms out of Limbo's terrain as the team enters Belasco's castle to assist Pixie. Finding Illyana defeated by Witchfire and Pixie transformed into a demon, Rockslide and Mercury are forced to fight Colossus and Wolverine who become magically mind-controlled.

Utopia
Rockslide moves with the X-Men when they are forced out of U.S. soil by Norman Osborn. Still a student, Rockslide dreams of becoming a full-fledged X-member and goes on vigilante missions with Anole in the cover of darkness. He is on Utopia during the attacks of Selene's Transmutant slaves as well as Bastion's Nimrod Sentinels from the future. When Wolverine decides to re-open the school in order to give the kids a life without violence, Santo agrees to go back to the school.

Under new guides such as Chamber, Santo has settled down as a kid for the first time since House of M.

Wolverine's School
When Wolverine reopens the school, Santo is sent back to Westchester to study alongside his friends. His best friend is Anole and he has almost lost all contact with his former best friend Hellion, although they all reside in the school.

House of X
In the pages of "House of X and Powers of X," Rockslide became a resident of Krakoa when it was established as a mutant paradise.

During the "Empyre" storyline, Rockslide, Loa, and Anole go to Arrako Point on Krakoa and meet with the High Summoner of Arrako where he teaches them the game of weakness which gets interrupted when a Cotati fleet approaches Krakoa.

During the "X of Swords" storyline, the High Summoner of Arrakoa betrayed Rockslide when he came to rescue Unus the Untouchable and killed him. His body was brought back to Krakoa. The Five tried to revive Rockslide only to end up creating a combination clone of every Rockslide variant throughout the Multiverse as a side effect of Rockslide dying in Otherworld. Polaris honored him by using the rocks that helped to make up his body to make a casting circle in the Voltus Glade so that Krakoa' champions can go up against Arrako's champions in the upcoming tournament.

Powers and abilities
In his initial appearance, Santo's body was composed completely of granite; with a look very similar to that of the Thing. This granted him superhuman strength, endurance, durability and the ability to fire his hands as projectiles.

In the Hellions mini-series, he was shattered by the Kingmaker and put back together by Julian, much like how a disembodied Emma Frost was reanimated by Jean Grey in the first New X-Men series. Santo's body was later obliterated by Nimrod. Again with Julian's assistance, he was eventually able to put himself back together. This time his appearance is larger and more rugged.

In the Quest for Magik arc, Santo attempts to fire his fists off in Limbo but Blindfold reveals that aspect of his powers doesn't work anymore. Although he is blown up again, Santo returns as a large lava type "golem". His molten rock form, being from Limbo, is also resistant to magic. This is shown when Darkchild tried to stop him from attacking her and when Belasco tries to zap him with magical energy, but they both have no effect.

Beast's suspicion is that after Nimrod shattered Santo, Nimrod must have atomized most of his original body and dissolved him in some sort of disembodied psychic state. Santo, in theory, is able to re-form himself as a "golem" from some kind of ambient earth matter and obtain that earth matter's properties. The first time his body was destroyed, he was able to reform from solid rocks and obtained a larger and rugged rock body. The second time, he reformed from Limbo's molten rocks and obtained the ability to generate and maintain heat from within, and also some magic resistance. The third time, he reformed from the school's grounds after exploding himself. Santo's original ability to fire off his limbs is seemingly lost in his new reformed bodies. Instead, the energy used to propel his limbs is now explosively released from his entire body, obliterating his form, from which he can recover.

During Kuurth, Breaker of Stone's attack on Utopia, Gambit unlocked Rockslide's potential energy to create a "living bomb", making "one of the largest mutant-generated force blasts recorded".

Personality
Santo is typically depicted as superficially brash, oblivious, and inconsiderate. Originally, he was introduced as a stereotypical bully. However, he cares deeply for his friends, recalling the deaths of the depowered students, especially Tag, which usually motivates him to perform feats of incredible strength or bravery. He also has a strong sensitivity for his teammates, such as when Dust continued to "beat herself up" over the death of Icarus as well as recognizing that he is not supposed to see her without her abaya. He is very protective of his teammate Mercury.  Santo also has a strong sense of honor, telling Anole and Pixie that he would quit the team if they were not included on the roster.

Wrongslide
In light of what happened to Rockslide, this combination clone of Rockslide was released into the custody of X-Force so that they can find a way to restore his mind.

Despite the fact that he tends to fall apart, this clone of Rockslide found peace on Krakoa where he often watches the Five at work while considering himself a memorial for the real Rockslide. Eventually, he took the name of Wrongslide when he was given a name by Krakoa's children and wanting to keep himself independent from the Rockslide that they know.

Other versions

House of M
In this reality, Santo was once again a champion superhuman wrestler.

In other media

Television
Rockslide made a cameo appearance in the Wolverine and the X-Men animated series. In the episode "Hindsight" Pt. 1, he was among the mutants that were captured by the Mutant Response Division.

Film
Rockslide appears in the early concept art of the 2014 film X-Men: Days of Future Past. His powers can be seen manifested by a future Sentinel in the final assault against the surviving mutants and remaining X-Men, thus is presumably deceased as the future Sentinels use mutant powers to kill mutants with their own individual abilities.

References

External links
 Rockslide at Marvel.com

Comics characters introduced in 2003
Fictional golems
Fictional characters with earth or stone abilities
Fictional characters with superhuman durability or invulnerability
Fictional characters from Boston
Marvel Comics male superheroes
Fictional Italian American people
Marvel Comics characters who are shapeshifters
Marvel Comics characters with superhuman strength
Marvel Comics mutants
Italian superheroes
Characters created by Nunzio DeFilippis
Characters created by Christina Weir